The 2022 Texas Longhorns volleyball team represented the University of Texas in the 2022 NCAA Division I women's volleyball season. The Texas Longhorns women's volleyball team, led by 22nd year head coach Jerritt Elliott, played their home games at Gregory Gymnasium. The Longhorns were members of the Big 12.

The Longhorns won their 6th straight Big 12 Championship, 15th overall, going 15–1 in conference play.

Texas defeated Louisville 3–0 to win the team's 3rd NCAA Title and 4th National Title overall.

Longhorn's outside hitter Logan Eggleston was named AVCA National Player of the Year, the first Texas player to receive the award In addition, fellow Longhorn's Zoe Fleck, Asjia O'Neal, Madisen Skinner, Saige Ka'aha'aina-Torres, and Molly Phillips were recognized as All-Americans alongside Eggleston.

Roster

Coaches

Support Staff

Schedule

References

Texas Volleyball
2022 Texas Volleyball
2022 in American sports
Sports teams in Texas
2022 NCAA Division I women's volleyball season